Pro peníze is a 1912 Czech silent drama film. It was made by Kinofa film company and directed by Anthony Pech. It was filmed in Prague and mostly used amateur actors.

References

1912 films
Austrian black-and-white films
Hungarian black-and-white films
Austro-Hungarian films
Czech silent films
Austrian silent films
Hungarian silent films
Hungarian drama films
Austrian drama films
1912 drama films
Silent drama films
Czech drama films
Czech black-and-white films